James McGranahan was a nineteenth-century American musician and composer, most known for his various hymns.  He was born 4 July 1840, in West Fallowfield or Adamsville, Pennsylvania, and died 9 July 1907 at his home in Kinsman, Ohio.

He composed over 25 hymns.  For example, in one work he is listed as the composer of three notable songs: "He Will Hide Me" by Mary Elizabeth Servoss, "Revive Thy Work, O Lord" by Albert Midlane, and "Come" by a "Mrs. James Gibson Johnson"; and he composed the music for at least 39 of the 79 hymns in a work co-authored with Ira D. Sankey. McGranahan composed most of the tunes for the lyrics of Major Daniel Webster Whittle, including EL NATHAN, the tune associated with Whittle's "I Know Whom I Have Believèd" (written 1883).

The music of his hymn "My Redeemer," written for lyrics by P. P. Bliss, is used as the accompaniment for the Latter-day Saints hymn "O My Father."

In Hawaii, McGranahan is noted for writing the music to the hymn "I Left It All With Jesus." The melody was given new lyrics, written sometime prior to 1886 by Lorenzo Lyons, an early missionary to Hawaii, and given a new title, "Hawai'i Aloha." Lyons was known as "Makua Laiana" or simply "Laiana." By the end of the 20th century "Hawai'i Aloha" had become one of Hawaii's best known and best loved songs. It is often sung at the close of public political, spiritual, educational and sporting events.

References

External links 
 
The Cyber Hymnal has a small article and a large collection of midi files of his music.

1840 births
1907 deaths
American Presbyterians
American Christian hymnwriters
19th-century American writers
People from Kinsman, Ohio